The 38th World Zionist Congress convened in Jerusalem, on October 20–22, 2020, with the participation of over 700 delegates and thousands of people from 35 countries to elect leadership positions and determine policy for the World Zionist Organization (WZO). Due to the ongoing COVID-19 pandemic during 2020, the Congress sessions and deliberations were held online by means of a global virtual platform.

Delegates and elections 
The Congress is composed of 524 delegates: 199 from Israel (38%), 152 from the United States (29%), and 173 from the rest of the Jewish diaspora (33%).

Australia 
Representation of the Australian Zionist delegation was determined on June 2, 2022. For the first time, progressive groups ran under the Hatikvah grouping, which included the New Israel Fund, Ameinu, Meretz, Habonim Dror and Hashomer Hatzair. The group won two seats. Other parties represented included ARZA (4 seats), Mizrahi (4 seats), Mercaz-Masorti (2 seats) and Friends of Likud (1 seat).

Israel
The number of delegates representing Israel in the Congress is determined in accordance with the size of the Zionist parties in the Knesset. Thus, the Israeli representatives to the Congress will be apportioned according to the results of the elections to the twenty-second Knesset, held in September 2019.

United States
Representation of the United States Zionist delegation is determined by elections held under the auspices of the American Zionist Movement several months prior to the Congress. These elections took place from January 21, 2020 to March 11, 2020.

123,575 votes were cast, more than double the number in the election for the previous congress in 2015. Fifteen groups, comprising over 1,800 candidates, competed for the 152 seats allocated to the American Zionist movement. The results of the elections were as follows:

Mexico
Representation of the Mexican delegation was determined by elections held under the auspices of the Mexican Zionist Federation during March, 2020. Five slates competed for 7 delegates allotted to México. The final results of the elections were as follows:

Other countries
The delegates from the Jewish communities other than Israel and the United States are usually determined by agreement between "the various Jewish communities and factions" instead of elections.

Notes

Resolutions

See also
 World Zionist Congress

References

External links
 38th World Zionist Congress
 Online voting for U.S. representation in the World Zionist Congress

World Zionist Congress
2020 conferences
Events in Jerusalem
2020 in Jerusalem
Events affected by the COVID-19 pandemic